Main Post Office Building in Belgrade is located on the corner of Takovska Street and Boulevard of Kralj Aleksandar, close to the National Assembly, the building of the President of Serbia (the building of the New Palace) and the Belgrade City Assembly (the building of the Old Palace). It is one of the most representative buildings of the most important state institution for postal traffic and services. It was constructed in the period from 1935 to 1938 as the palace of the Post Office Savings Bank, the Main Post Office and the Main Telegraph. Since the completion of the work to date, the part of the palace from Takovska Street designed for the work of the Main Post Office has not changed its basic purpose. On the other hand, the part of the palace from King Alexander Boulevard in which the Post Office Savings Bank was located, from 1946 to September 2006, was used to house the National Bank until its relocation to a new facility on Slavija Square. Since 2003, some ministries of the Republic of Serbia were located in this building, and since 2013, it is used by the Constitutional Court of Serbia. The same year, in 2013, the Palace of the Main Post Office was declared a cultural monument.

History of construction 

The Main Post office, whose history of service dates back to the forties of the nineteenth century, was the highest postal institution not only in Serbia but in the whole of the Кingdom of Serbs, Croats and Slovenes, later the Кingdom of Yugoslavia. On the other hand, the Post Office Savings Bank began operations on 1 October 1923 at the Palace “Мoskvа“ in Теrazije. Although a young institution, the Post Office Savings Bank became one of the "most popular financial institutions" in the whole country after a few years of operation, so the rooms of  the Palace “Moscow“ became too small for her work. The authorities solved the question of inadequate accommodation of both institutions with the construction of a single building of the Main Post Office and the Post Office Savings Bank.

Despite all the activities related to the construction of buildings intended for postal services, the building of the Main Post Office was not constructed until the beginning of the fourth decade of the twentieth century. An all-Yugoslav competition for the project of the Palace of the Post Office Savings Bank and the Main Post Office and Telegraph was announced in Belgrade in 1930. From a total of fifteen of submitted works, whose authors were architects from all over the country, as well as those who were in training or working abroad, in September 1930, three papers and four purchases were selected and awarded. First prize was awarded to the joint project of Zagreb architects Јosip Pičman and Аndrija Baranji, designed according to the principles of modern architecture, while the second prize was awarded to the also modern project of Slovenian architect Аco Lovrenčić. However, the realization of the winning project was soon abandoned. The beginning of the thirties of the last century was marked by the economic crisis in the European context, while the second reason lay in the discontent of the highest state authorities by the selected project of architect Pičman, which in their opinion did not satisfy the requirements for representative and monumental architecture of public buildings. The reduction and ease of the facade canvas of Pičman’s project did not fit the dominant architectural concept, which included the architecture of public buildings expressing the power, prosperity and statehood of the young Yugoslav Kingdom through its gorgeous, academically shaped facades. Immediately after the competition, at the end of 1930, it was decided that the Ministry of Construction amend the winning project. Elaboration of the sketches was entrusted to the architect Dimitrije M. Leko, and within the ministry, a narrower internal competition was organized to create new plans for the façades of the building, where the project of the architect Vasilije Androsov was evaluated as the best one. However, after the adoption of the new project of architect Androsov, the construction of the building did not start until another almost five years. Having approved the construction in 1934, on 17 August 1935, the ceremony of consecration of the foundation stone took place. The work on the realization of this very important facility for the then Belgrade environment lasted three years and ended on 10 October 1938.

Architecture 

Architecture of the Palace of the Post Office Savings Bank, Main Post Office and Main Telegraph in Belgrade reflects the complexity of the social, political, stylistic and aesthetic circumstances that ruled the entire artistic creativity of the interwar period. It is based on a combination of modernist and functional base and representatively molded facades in the academic style. New Androsov’s project largely relied on the initial competition solution, which is primarily reflected in the decision of the base and disposition of space. Relations of mass, the position of the building in relation to the street, contours of the asymmetrically resolved basis, as well as the city and entrance number were retained from the original project to detail. All facades of the freestanding palace were recomposed according to the principles of academic monumental architecture, typical of the architecture of Belgrade of the fourth decade, while instead of the rather simple facades with combined glass and concrete, the author predicted cladding with granite slabs and artificial stone. The highlighted avant-corps of the main facade, except that it shares the façade canvas into two unequal, asymmetrical parts, also reflects the internal functional division of the object. The avant-corps is treated as a façade and outlined by the main portal in the ground-floor, elongated by Doric columns in the zone from the second to the fifth floor and a characteristic tower with a clock in the highest zone. Adjusting the modern concept of building to visually expressing the strength and prosperity of the new Yugoslav state and Belgrade as its capital with a representative academic base of its expression reflected the widely accepted attitude of the government with the monumental character of public buildings, designed in the style of high-academicism. As the building of the central and the most important postal institution in the Kingdom of Yugoslavia, the Palace of the Main Post Office is an important testimony to the development of postal services and activities, from its founding to the present. On the other hand, its striking position at the crossroads of two important city roads, is one of the most important visual benchmarks of the city center. At the same time, the monumentality of the continent and the representativeness of the external processing classify it among the major examples of academic architecture of Belgrade.

References

Literature 

 

Buildings and structures in Belgrade
Post office buildings
Palilula, Belgrade